Tallåsen is a locality situated in Ljusdal Municipality, Gävleborg County, Sweden with 586 inhabitants in 2010. It lies about 5 km northwest of Ljusdal. The village is mainly a bedroom community; most inhabitants commute to Ljusdal. The Sillerboån stream flows through the village.

Tallåsen used to have a railway station, and was one of many Swedish places that blossomed because the railway was built through it at the end of the 19th century.

References 

Populated places in Ljusdal Municipality
Hälsingland